The Birthplace of Frédéric Chopin is a "dworek" (lit. little manor-house – in fact eastern outbuilding of non-existing mansion) surrounded by a large (over 17 acres) natural park at the banks of Utrata River in Żelazowa Wola near Sochaczew in Poland – presently museum of the composer, department of the Fryderyk Chopin Museum in Warsaw.

History 

The very first connotation of the village was the document of 1579, in which Mikołaj and Piotr Żelazo were mentioned as the owners of Żelazowa Wola. In the end of 18th century Piotr Łuszczewski, and next Paprockis family were the owners. There were eight houses in the village that time.

At the turn of 18th and 19th century the village was purchased by Skarbeks family. Kacper and Ludwika Skarbek lived in a mansion, which was framed by two minor outbuildings. Tutor of their children was Mikołaj Chopin, who married in 1806 Justyna née Krzyżanowska, administrator of the mansion related to the owners.

Frédéric Chopin was born here on March 1, 1810, as a second child of Chopins. All his sisters: older Ludwika Marianna, as well as two younger, Justyna Izabela and Emilia, were born in Warsaw. He did not stay in Żelazowa Wola for long (in the Fall of the same year the Chopins moved to Warsaw), but young Frédéric visited later often Żelazowa Wola, going there for vacations and family events. In 1812 Skarbek's mansion burned to the ground, but both outbuildings survived.

After the suicide of Michał Skarbek in 1834, his family sold Żelazowa Wola to Szuberts. In 1840, the ownership of the village was transferred to baron Eugehard, and soon after to the Peszel family. Later, in the years 1859–1879, Adam Towiański was an owner. His possessions consisted of granges in Mokas and Żelazowa Wola, as well as villages: Żelazowa Wola, Chodakówek, Budy Żelazowskie and Towiany. In that time there were 11 houses built of bricks 12 wooden ones, and a water mill. From 1879 the manor was owned by Aleksander Pawłowski, who used the Chopin's birthplace as a storage house.

In 1894 – on the initiative of Russian composer Mily Balakirev – the monument of Frédéric Chopin was built in park by Bronisław Żochowski and Jan Wojdyga. During the World War I the second outbuilding was burned. In 1918 the grange of Żelazowa Wola was lotted out and handed to the local farmers.

In 1928, the "Chopin House Friends Society" (pol. Towarzystwo Przyjaciół Domu Chopina) and the Chopin Committee (pol. During the World War II German troops occupied the building. In the Summer of 1944 it was used as a military hospital.

Since 1969 there has been a monument to the pianist, designed by Józef Gosławski, in the park adjacent to Chopin's birthplace.

See also 
 List of music museums

References

 Adam Zamoyski, Chopin: a Biography, New York, Doubleday, 1980, .
 Chopin's birthplace on WarsawPlaces.com – Information about Żelazowa Wola

Museums in Masovian Voivodeship
Chopin
Sochaczew County
Monuments and memorials to Frédéric Chopin
Historic house museums in Poland
Biographical museums in Poland
Chopin, Frederic